Dr. Sanjay Oak is an Indian surgeon, specialised in the field of Paediatric Surgery and Laparoscopy. He was former dean of Seth G. S. Medical College and King Edward Memorial Hospital in Mumbai, Maharashtra, India and an elected Fellow of the National Academy of Medical Sciences.

He was former Director of Medical Education and Major Hospitals for Medical Colleges and Hospitals under Municipal Corporation of Mumbai. He is Prolific writer in Marathi and weekly columnist of great repute.

Dr Sanjay N. Oak assumed charge as a Vice Chancellor of University Padmashree Dr D Y Patil Vidyapeeth, Navi Mumbai from October 2012.

Dr Oak worked as CEO of Prince Aly Khan Hospital, Mumbai and Aga Khan Health Services, India for 4 years.

Recently appointed as the Chairman of Task force for COVID-19 in Maharashtra.

Dr Sanjay Oak now works as Director Professional Services and Project Management at Kaushalya (Thane), UAIMS Sangli and SVKM Shirpur hospitals.

References

1959 births
Living people
Indian surgeons
Indian paediatricians
Fellows of the National Academy of Medical Sciences
Medical doctors from Mumbai